Busch is a German surname, a cognate of Bush. Notable people with the surname include:

Adam Busch (born 1978), American actor
Adolf Busch (1891–1952), German violinist and composer
Adolphus Busch (1839–1913), founder of Anheuser-Busch
Adolphus Busch III (1891–1946), 3rd generation brewing magnate
August Anheuser Busch Sr. (1865–1934), 2nd generation brewing magnate
August Busch III (born 1937), 4th generation brewing magnate
August Busch IV (born 1964), 5th generation brewing magnate
August Ludwig Busch (1804–1855), German astronomer
Charles Busch (born 1954), American actor
Dirk Busch (born 1951), German professor, singer, and songwriter
Ebba Busch (born 1987), Swedish politician, leader of the Christian Democrats
Erika Büsch (born 1974), Uruguayan musician
Ernst Busch (field marshal) (1885–1945), German field marshal
Ernst Busch (actor) (1900–1980), German singer and actor
Fritz Busch (1890–1951), German conductor
Fredric N. Busch (b. 1958), American psychiatrist and psychoanalyst
Germán Busch (1904–1939), President of Bolivia
Gidone Busch (1968–1999), Hasidic Jew who was shot to death by officers of the NYPD in Borough Park, Brooklyn
Gundi Busch (1935–2014), German figure skater and coach
Gussie Busch (1899–1989), 3rd generation brewing magnate
Hans Busch (1884–1973), German physicist
Joe Busch (1907–1999), Australian rugby league footballer
Johannes Busch (1399–c. 1480), theologian
Jon Busch (born 1976), American professional soccer player
Julius Hermann Moritz Busch (1821–1899), German publicist who published the memoirs of Bismarck
Kurt Busch (born 1978), American NASCAR driver
Kyle Busch (born 1985), American NASCAR driver
Lou Busch (1910–1979), American musician and songwriter
Mae Busch (1891–1946), Australian actress
Michael E. Busch (born 1947), speaker of the Maryland House of Delegates
Neil Busch, American musician
Niven Busch (1903–1991), American novelist
Paul Busch (physicist) (1955–2018), German mathematical physicist
Rene Busch (born 1971), Estonian tennis player
Wilhelm Busch (1832–1908), German poet and caricaturist

German-language surnames
Jewish surnames